Puya pichinchae is a species of plant in the family Bromeliaceae. It is endemic to Ecuador.  Its natural habitat is subtropical or tropical dry shrubland. It is threatened by habitat loss.

References

Flora of Ecuador
pichinchae
Vulnerable plants
Taxonomy articles created by Polbot